Jean Galatoire was born in a small village near Pau, France. Galatoire immigrated to America in 1880 where he bought an inn and a restaurant in Birmingham, Alabama. In 1896 he moved to New Orleans and opened up a café.

In 1905 Jean Galatoire bought out Victor's Restaurant on Bourbon Street and reestablished it as Galatoire's.

References

French chefs
American chefs
French restaurateurs
American restaurateurs
Year of death missing
Year of birth missing